Pruritus scroti is itchiness of the scrotum that may be secondary to an infectious cause.

See also 
 Pruritus vulvae
 Pruritus ani
 Pruritus

References

External links 

Pruritic skin conditions